De Snip is a smock mill in Workum, Friesland, Netherlands. It has been restored to working order. Designated as being held in reserve, it is listed as a Rijksmonument.

History
De Snip was built in the mid-19th century to drain a  polder. A hollow post mill having previously stood on the site.  Following a long period of dereliction, the mill was restored in 1974-45 by millwright Tacoma of Stiens, Friesland. The windhaft in the mill came from De Kolthofpoldermolen, Oosterbierum, Friesland, which had burnt down on 13 December 1972. The mill formerly had a wooden windshaft. In 1977, De Snip was in the ownership of the Workumer Molenstichting. A new Archimedes' screw . The mill is owned by the Molenstichting Sûdwest Fryslân. It is listed as a Rijksmonument, №39518.

Description

De Snip is what the Dutch describe as a Grondzeiler. It is a two storey smock mill on a single storey base. There is no stage, the sails reaching almost to ground level. The mill is winded by tailpole and winch. The smock and cap are thatched. The sails are Common sails. The sails are carried on a cast iron windshaft, which was cast by Fabrikaat Sallandia, Zwolle, Overijssel. The windshaft carries the brake wheel which has 54 cogs. This drives the wallower (25 cogs) at  the top of the upright shaft. At the bottom of the upright shaft there are two crown wheels The upper crown wheel, which has 30 cogs drives an Archimedes' screw via a crown wheel. The lower crown wheel, which has 29 cogs is carried on the axle of an Archimedes' screw, which is used to drain the polder. The screw is  diameter. It is inclined at 27°. Each revolution of the screw lifts  of water.

Public access
De Snip is open whenever it is working, or by appointment.

References

Windmills in Friesland
Buildings and structures completed in the 19th century
Smock mills in the Netherlands
Windpumps in the Netherlands
Agricultural buildings in the Netherlands
Rijksmonuments in Friesland
Octagonal buildings in the Netherlands